José Miguel Acevedo Garrido (born 11 December 1985) is a Chilean former footballer. His last club was Malleco Unido in the Segunda División Profesional de Chile.

External links
 
 

1985 births
Living people
People from Rancagua
People from Cachapoal Province
People from O'Higgins Region
Chilean footballers
Deportes Santa Cruz footballers
Naval de Talcahuano footballers
Cobreloa footballers
Deportes Valdivia footballers
Deportes Copiapó footballers
Malleco Unido footballers
Deportes Iberia footballers
Chilean Primera División players
Primera B de Chile players
Segunda División Profesional de Chile players
Association football goalkeepers